The Rhodesian Dunlop Masters was a golf tournament that was held in Rhodesia. It was an event on the South African Tour until the late 1970s. 

The tournament rotated round three host courses, Royal Salisbury Golf Club and Chapman Golf Club in Salisbury (now Harare), and Bulawayo Golf Club in Bulawayo.

Due to the seasonal nature of the circuit there were two tournaments held in both 1971 and 1976, and no event in 1975, as it was rescheduled between early and late dates in the season.

Winners

References 

Sport in Rhodesia
Former Sunshine Tour events
Golf tournaments in Zimbabwe